Acho Chakatouny (1885–1957) was an Armenian actor, film director and makeup artist associated with the silent era. Chakatouny was born in Gyumri, then part of the Russian Empire. Following the Russian Revolution of 1917 he fled into exile, and settled in France.

Selected filmography
 The Man with the Hispano (1926)
 Michel Strogoff (1926)
 Napoleon (1927)
 The White Devil (1930)
 The Lady of Lebanon (1934)

References

Bibliography
 Michelangelo Capua. Anatole Litvak: The Life and Films. McFarland, 2015.

External links

19th-century births
1957 deaths
French male film actors
Armenian male film actors
People who emigrated to escape Bolshevism
Armenian male silent film actors
Emigrants from the Russian Empire to France